The Peter Quarnberg House is a historic house in Scipio, Utah. It was built in 1900 by Antone Peterson, an immigrant from Sweden, for Peter J. Quarnberg, also an immigrant from Sweden who converted to the Church of Jesus Christ of Latter-day Saints with his parents before settling in Scipio in 1872. Quarnberg married  Caroline Marie Hanseen, also an immigrant from Sweden, and they had five sons and two daughters. They resided in this house, designed in the Queen Anne architectural style. It later belonged to their son Archie, followed by his daughter Coleen Quarnberg Memmot. It has been listed on the National Register of Historic Places since July 26, 1982.

Quarnberg was born January 22, 1854, in "Wermlingbo" (perhaps Vamlingbo?), Gotland, Sweden.  The Hanseens were also immigrants from Gotland.

References

		
National Register of Historic Places in Millard County, Utah
Queen Anne architecture in Utah
Houses completed in 1900
1900 establishments in Utah